A trombone concerto is a concerto for solo trombone and instrumental ensemble, customarily the orchestra.

Selected examples
 Bert Appermont
 Colors for Trombone (1998)
 Ferdinand David
 Trombone Concertino (1837)
 Launy Grøndahl
 Trombone Concerto (1924)
 James MacMillan
 Trombone Concerto (2016)
 Johan de Meij
 T-Bone Concerto (1996)
 Nikolai Rimsky-Korsakov
 Trombone Concerto (1877)
 Nino Rota
 Trombone Concerto in C (1966)
 Christopher Rouse
 Trombone Concerto (1991)
 Jan Sandström
 Motorbike Odyssey (1989)
 Nathaniel Shilkret
 Trombone Concerto (1942)
 Melinda Wagner
 Trombone Concerto (2007)
 Iannis Xenakis
 Troorkh (1991)